The Fujifilm FinePix products are a line of digital cameras produced by Fujifilm.  They include compact point and shoot models, tough, waterproof models, bridge digital cameras, digital SLRs and mirrorless cameras. Many use Fujifilm's proprietary Super CCD technology sensors and CMOS sensors for high-end models.

Model series

Current series
 F series: Travel Long Zoom, Compact models with exceptional low-light performance and advanced features.
 J series: Easy to Use, Low cost, slim, compact series introduced in 2008.
 S series: Bridge digital camera ultra-zoom series (including SL Series) with CCD or CMOS sensor.
 HS series: Bridge digital camera ultra-zoom series with CMOS sensors, better than S series.
 T series: Stylist Zoom, Compact models with powerful zoom.
 XP series: Tough, waterproof, shockproof, dustproof and freezeproof series introduced in 2009.
 Z series: Slim, Ultra-compact, stylish series introduced in 2005
 Real 3D series: Known also as W Series Stereoscopic cameras introduced in 2009.
 X series: Announced at photokina 2010, the Fujifilm Finepix X100 has been 'developed without compromise' and promises to offer the 'absolute best in image quality' in a compact camera. Some reviewers have suggested that, while the camera takes excellent photos, it suffers from design flaws and a poor focus system. The X series has been expanded to include the Fujifilm X10 - a 'scaled down' X100 with 4x manual barrel zoom lens, the Fujifilm X-S1 bridge camera and the Fujifilm X-Pro1 Mirrorless interchangeable-lens camera which uses the Fujifilm X-mount lens system. The Fujifilm X100S and Fujifilm X20 in 2013 replaced the X100 and X10 respectively, while the interchangeable lens line up expanded with the X-E1, X-E2, X-M1, X-A1 and the X-T1 models. In September 2016, Fuji announced the Fujifilm GFX 50S a medium format addition to the X series, using G mount lenses.

Discontinued series
 A series: Entry-level point and shoot models, introduced in 2001.
 E series: These include the E500, E510, E550 from 2003 - 2004.
 M-series: Including the M603.
 PR21: Included a built in Instax instant film printer
 S5 Pro: Nikon F-mount compatible digital SLR.
 V series: And a rare V10 in early 2006.

See also

 Digital photography
 Stereo camera
 Flash (photography)

References

External links 

Official range of Fujifilm digital cameras
Official UK range of Fujifilm digital cameras
Official FinePix X-Pro1 page - English - Showcase for the FinePix X-Pro1  
Official FinePix X100 page - English - Showcase for the FinePix X100  
Fujifilm X100  - Sample Tests